The following is an alphabetical list of Eucalyptus species accepted by the Australian Plant Census as at February 2019. Several species only occurring outside Australia, including E. orophila, E. urophylla and E. wetarensis are listed at the World Checklist of Selected Plant Families.

A

 Eucalyptus abdita Brooker & Hopper
 Eucalyptus absita Grayling & Brooker – Badgingarra box
 Eucalyptus acaciiformis H.Deane & Maiden – wattle-leaved peppermint
 Eucalyptus accedens W.Fitzg. – powderbark wandoo
 Eucalyptus acies Brooker – Woolburnup mallee
 Eucalyptus acmenoides Schauer in W.G.Walpers – white mahogany 
 Eucalyptus acroleuca L.A.S.Johnson & K.D.Hill – Lakefield coolibah
 Eucalyptus adesmophloia (Brooker & Hopper) D.Nicolle & M.E.French
 Eucalyptus aequioperta Brooker & Hopper – Welcome Hill gum
 Eucalyptus agglomerata Maiden – blue-leaved stringybark
 Eucalyptus aggregata H.Deane & Maiden – black gum
 Eucalyptus alaticaulis R.J.Watson & Ladiges - Grampians grey-gum
 Eucalyptus alatissima (Brooker & Hopper) D. Nicolle
 Eucalyptus alba ex Blume – poplar gum
 Eucalyptus alba var. australasica Blakely & Jacobs
 Eucalyptus albens Benth. – white box
 Eucalyptus albida Maiden & Blakely – white-leaved mallee
 Eucalyptus albopurpurea (Boomsma) D.Nicolle – purple-flowered mallee
 Eucalyptus alipes (L.A.S.Johnson & K.D.Hill) D.Nicolle & Brooker
 Eucalyptus alligatrix L.A.S.Johnson & K.D.Hill - silver stringybark
 Eucalyptus alligatrix subsp. alligatrix
 Eucalyptus alligatrix subsp. limaensis Brooker, Slee & J.D.Briggs – Lima stringybark
 Eucalyptus alligatrix subsp. miscella Brooker, Slee & J.D.Briggs,
 Eucalyptus × alpina Lindl. – Grampians gum
 Eucalyptus ammophila Brooker & Slee – sandplain red gum
 Eucalyptus amplifolia Naudin – cabbage gum
 Eucalyptus amplifolia subsp. amplifolia
 Eucalyptus amplifolia subsp. sessiliflora  (Blakely) L.A.S.Johnson & K.D.Hill
 Eucalyptus amygdalina Labill. – black peppermint
 Eucalyptus ancophila L.A.S.Johnson & K.D.Hill
 Eucalyptus andrewsii Maiden – New England blackbutt
 Eucalyptus angophoroides R.T.Baker – apple-topped box
 Eucalyptus angularis Brooker & Hopper – Lesueur phantom mallee 
 Eucalyptus angulosa Schauer in W.G.Walpers – ridge fruited mallee
 Eucalyptus angustissima  F.Muell. – narrow-leaved mallee
 Eucalyptus annettae D.Nicolle & M.E.French
 Eucalyptus annulata Benth. – open-fruited mallee
 Eucalyptus annuliformis Grayling & Brooker – Badgerabbie mallee
 Eucalyptus apiculata R.T.Baker & H.G.Sm. – narrow-leaved mallee ash
 Eucalyptus apodophylla Blakely & Jacobs in W.F.Blakely – whitebark
 Eucalyptus apothalassica L.A.S.Johnson & K.D.Hill – inland white mahogany
 Eucalyptus approximans Maiden – Barren Mountain mallee
 Eucalyptus aquatica (Blakely) L.A.S.Johnson & K.D.Hill – mountain swamp gum
 Eucalyptus aquilina Brooker – Mount Le Grand mallee
 Eucalyptus arachnaea Brooker & Hopper – black-stemmed mallee
 Eucalyptus arachnaea subsp. arachnaea
 Eucalyptus arachnaea subsp. arrecta  Brooker & Hopper
 Eucalyptus arborella Brooker & Hopper – Twertup mallet
 Eucalyptus arcana (D.Nicolle & Brooker) Rule – mallee manna gum 
 Eucalyptus archeri Maiden & Blakely in J.H.Maiden – alpine cider gum
 Eucalyptus arenacea Marginson & Ladiges – desert stringybark
 Eucalyptus arenicola Rule – Holey Plains peppermint
 Eucalyptus argillacea W.Fitzg. – Mount House box
 Eucalyptus argophloia Blakely – Queensland white gum
 Eucalyptus argutifolia Grayling & Brooker – Wabling Hill mallee
 Eucalyptus aridimontana D.Nicolle & M.E.French
 Eucalyptus armillata D.Nicolle & M.E.French – red-flowered mallee
 Eucalyptus aromaphloia Pryor & J.H.Willis – Creswick apple-box
 Eucalyptus articulata Brooker & Hopper – Ponton Creek mallee
 Eucalyptus aspersa Brooker & Hopper
 Eucalyptus aspratilis L.A.S.Johnson & K.D.Hill – soak yate
 Eucalyptus assimilans L.A.S.Johnson & K.D.Hill
 Eucalyptus astringens (Maiden) Maiden – brown mallet
 Eucalyptus astringens subsp. astringens
 Eucalyptus astringens subsp. redacta  Brooker & Hopper
 Eucalyptus atrata L.A.S.Johnson & K.D.Hill – Herberton ironbark
 Eucalyptus aurifodina Rule – small-leaved brown stringybark

B

 Eucalyptus badjensis Beuzev. & M.B.Welch – Big Badja gum
 Eucalyptus baeuerlenii F.Muell. – Baeuerlen's gum
 Eucalyptus baileyana F.Muell. – Bailey's stringybark
 Eucalyptus baiophylla D.Nicolle & Brooker
 Eucalyptus bakeri Maiden – Baker's mallee
 Eucalyptus × balanites Grayling & Brooker Cadda Road mallee
 Eucalyptus × balanopelex L.A.S.Johnson & K.D.Hill
 Eucalyptus balladoniensis Brooker – Balladonia mallee
 Eucalyptus balladoniensis subsp. balladoniensis
 Eucalyptus balladoniensis subsp. sedens  L.A.S.Johnson & K.D.Hill
 Eucalyptus bancroftii (Maiden) Maiden – orange gum
 Eucalyptus banksii Maiden – Tenterfield woollybutt
 Eucalyptus barberi L.A.S.Johnson & Blaxell – Barber's gum
 Eucalyptus baudiniana D.J.Carr & S.G.M.Carr
 Eucalyptus baueriana Schauer in W.G.Walpers – blue box
 Eucalyptus baueriana subsp. baueriana
 Eucalyptus baueriana subsp. deddickensis  Rule
 Eucalyptus baueriana subsp. thalassina  Rule – Werribee blue box
 Eucalyptus baxteri (Benth.) Maiden & Blakely ex J.M.Black – brown stringybark
 Eucalyptus beaniana L.A.S.Johnson & K.D.Hill – Bean's ironbark
 Eucalyptus beardiana Brooker & Blaxell – Beard's mallee
 Eucalyptus behriana F.Muell. – bull mallee
 Eucalyptus bensonii L.A.S.Johnson & K.D.Hill – Benson's stringybark
 Eucalyptus benthamii Maiden & Cambage – Camden white gum
 Eucalyptus × beyeri R.T.Baker 
 Eucalyptus beyeriana L.A.S.Johnson & K.D.Hill – Beyer's ironbark
 Eucalyptus bigalerita F.Muell. – northern salmon gum
 Eucalyptus blakelyi Maiden – Blakely's redgum
 Eucalyptus blaxellii L.A.S.Johnson & K.D.Hill – Howatharra mallee
 Eucalyptus blaxlandii Maiden & Cambage – Blaxland's stringybark
 Eucalyptus boliviana J.B.Williams & K.D.Hill – Bolivia Hill stringybark
 Eucalyptus bosistoana F.Muell. – coast grey box, Gippsland grey box
 Eucalyptus botryoides Sm. – southern mahogany
 Eucalyptus brachyandra F.Muell. – tropical red box
 Eucalyptus brachycalyx Blakely – gilja, Chindoo mallee
 Eucalyptus × brachyphylla C.A.Gardner
 Eucalyptus brandiana Hopper & McQuoid
 Eucalyptus brassiana S.T.Blake – Cape York red gum, gum-topped peppermint
 Eucalyptus brevifolia F.Muell. – northern white gum, snappy gum
 Eucalyptus brevipes Brooker – Mukinbudin mallee
 Eucalyptus brevistylis Brooker – Rate's tingle
 Eucalyptus bridgesiana R.T.Baker – apple box, apple, apple gum
 Eucalyptus brockwayi C.A.Gardner – Dundas mahogany
 Eucalyptus brookeriana  A.M.Gray – Brooker's gum
 Eucalyptus broviniensis A.R.Bean 
 Eucalyptus brownii  Maiden & Cambage – Brown's box, Reid River box
 Eucalyptus bunyip Rule
 Eucalyptus buprestium F.Muell. – apple mallee, ball-fruited mallee
 Eucalyptus burdettiana Blakely & H.Steedman – Burdett's mallee
 Eucalyptus burgessiana L.A.S.Johnson & Blaxell – Faulconbridge mallee ash
 Eucalyptus burracoppinensis Maiden & Blakely – Burracoppin mallee

C

 Eucalyptus cadens J.D.Briggs & Crisp – tumble-down swamp gum, Warby Range swamp-gum
 Eucalyptus caesia Benth. – caesia
 Eucalyptus cajuputea Miq. – narrow-leaved peppermint box
 Eucalyptus calcareana Boomsma – Nundroo mallee, Nundroo gum
 Eucalyptus calcicola Brooker – Boranup mallee, Harry Butler's mallee or Hamelin Bay mallee
 Eucalyptus calcicola subsp. calcicola
 Eucalyptus calcicola subsp. unita  D.Nicolle
 Eucalyptus caleyi Maiden – Caley's ironbark
 Eucalyptus caleyi subsp. caleyi
 Eucalyptus caleyi subsp. ovendenii L.A.S.Johnson & K.D.Hill
 Eucalyptus caliginosa Blakely & McKie in W.F.Blakely – broad-leaved stringybark, New England stringybark
 Eucalyptus calycogona Turcz. - gooseberry mallee, square-fruited mallee
 Eucalyptus calycogona subsp. calycogona
 Eucalyptus calycogona subsp. miraculum D.Nicolle & M.E.French
 Eucalyptus calycogona subsp. spaffordii D.Nicolle
 Eucalyptus calycogona subsp. trachybasis D.Nicolle
 Eucalyptus calyerup McQuoid & Hopper
 Eucalyptus camaldulensis Dehnh. – river red gum
 Eucalyptus camaldulensis subsp. acuta Brooker & M.W.McDonald
 Eucalyptus camaldulensis subsp. arida Brooker & M.W.McDonald
 Eucalyptus camaldulensis Dehnh. subsp. camaldulensis
 Eucalyptus camaldulensis subsp. minima Brooker & M.W.McDonald
 Eucalyptus camaldulensis subsp. obtusa (Blakely) Brooker & M.W.McDonald
 Eucalyptus camaldulensis subsp. refulgens Brooker & M.W.McDonald
 Eucalyptus camaldulensis subsp. simulata Brooker & Kleinig
 Eucalyptus cambageana Maiden –  Dawson River blackbutt, Coowarra box
 Eucalyptus cameronii Blakely & McKie in W.F.Blakely – diehard stringybark
 Eucalyptus camfieldii Maiden – Camfield's stringybark
 Eucalyptus campanulata  R.T.Baker & H.G.Sm. – New England blackbutt
 Eucalyptus campaspe  S.Moore – silver gimlet
 Eucalyptus camphora R.T.Baker – swamp gum
 Eucalyptus camphora subsp. camphora
 Eucalyptus camphora subsp. humeana  L.A.S.Johnson & K.D.Hill
 Eucalyptus canaliculata Maiden – grey gum
 Eucalyptus canescens D.Nicolle – Ooldea Range mallee
 Eucalyptus canescens subsp. beadellii  Nicolle
 Eucalyptus canescens subsp. canescens
 Eucalyptus canobolensis (L.A.S.Johnson & K.D.Hill) J.T.Hunter – Mount Canobolas candlebark
 Eucalyptus capillosa Brooker & Hopper – wheatbelt wandoo, mallee wandoo
 Eucalyptus capillosa subsp. capillosa
 Eucalyptus capillosa subsp. polyclada  Brooker & Hopper
 Eucalyptus capitanea L.A.S.Johnson & K.D.Hill – desert ridge-fruited mallee
 Eucalyptus capitellata Sm. – brown stringybark
 Eucalyptus captiosa Brooker & Hopper
 Eucalyptus carnea R.T.Baker – thick leaved mahogany, broad-leaved mahogany
 Eucalyptus carnei C.A.Gardner – Carne's blackbutt
 Eucalyptus carolaniae Rule
 Eucalyptus castrensis K.D.Hill - Singleton mallee
 Eucalyptus celastroides Turcz. – mirret
 Eucalyptus celastroides subsp. celastroides
 Eucalyptus celastroides subsp. virella  Brooker
 Eucalyptus cephalocarpa Blakely – mealy stringybark, silver stringybark
 Eucalyptus ceracea Brooker & Done – Seppelt Range gum
 Eucalyptus cerasiformis Brooker & Blaxell – cherry-fruited mallee
 Eucalyptus ceratocorys (Blakely) L.A.S.Johnson & K.D.Hill – horn-capped mallee
 Eucalyptus cernua Brooker & Hopper – red-flowered or yellow-flowered mort
 Eucalyptus chapmaniana Cameron – Bogong gum
 Eucalyptus chartaboma D.Nicolle – paperbark gum
 Eucalyptus chloroclada (Blakely) L.A.S.Johnson & K.D.Hill – Baradine gum, red gum or dirty gum
 Eucalyptus chlorophylla Brooker & Done - green-leaf box, glossy-leaved box
 Eucalyptus × chrysantha Blakely & H.Steedman
 Eucalyptus cinerea F.Muell. ex Benth. - Argyle apple, mealy stringybark
 Eucalyptus cinerea subsp. cinerea
 Eucalyptus cinerea subsp. triplex  (L.A.S.Johnson & K.D.Hill) Brooker, Slee & J.D.Briggs
 Eucalyptus cladocalyx F.Muell. – sugar gum
 Eucalyptus cladocalyx subsp. crassaD.Nicholle
 Eucalyptus cladocalyx subsp. petilaD.Nicholle
 Eucalyptus clelandiorum (Maiden) Maiden – Cleland's blackbutt
 Eucalyptus clivicola Brooker & Hopper – green mallet
 Eucalyptus cloeziana F.Muell. Gympie messmate, dead finish
 Eucalyptus cneorifolia A.Cunn. ex DC. – Kangaroo Island narrow-leaf mallee
 Eucalyptus coccifera Hook.f. – Tasmanian snow gum
 Eucalyptus codonocarpa Blakely & McKie – bell-fruited mallee ash, New England mallee ash
 Eucalyptus comitae-vallis Maiden – Comet Vale mallee
 Eucalyptus concinna Maiden & Blakely in J.H.Maiden – Victoria Desert Mallee
 Eucalyptus conferruminata D.J.Carr & S.G.M.Carr – Bald Island marlock, bushy yate
 Eucalyptus conferruminata subsp. conferruminata
 Eucalyptus conferruminata subsp. recherche  D.Nicolle & M.E.French
 Eucalyptus conferta Rule
 Eucalyptus confluens W.Fitzg. ex Maiden – Kimberley gum
 Eucalyptus conglobata (Benth.) Maiden – cong mallee, Port Lincoln mallee
 Eucalyptus conglobata subsp. conglobata
 Eucalyptus conglobata subsp. perata  Brooker & Slee
 Eucalyptus conglomerata Maiden & Blakely in J.H.Maiden – swamp stringybark
 Eucalyptus conica H.Deane & Maiden – fuzzy box
 Eucalyptus × conjuncta L.A.S.Johnson & K.D.Hill
 Eucalyptus consideniana Maiden – yertchuk
 Eucalyptus conspicua L.A.S.Johnson & K.D.Hill – Gippsland swamp-box
 Eucalyptus conveniens L.A.S.Johnson & K.D.Hill
 Eucalyptus coolabah Blakely & Jacobs in W.F.Blakely - coolabah, coolibah
 Eucalyptus cooperiana F.Muell. – many-flowered mallee
 Eucalyptus copulans L.A.S.Johnson & K.D.Hill
 Eucalyptus cordata Labill. – heart-leaved silver gum
 Eucalyptus cordata subsp. cordata
 Eucalyptus cordata subsp. quadrangulosa  D.Nicolle, B.M.Potts & McKinnon
 Eucalyptus cornuta Labill. – yate
 Eucalyptus coronata C.A.Gardner – crowned mallee
 Eucalyptus corrugata Luehm. – rough fruited mallee, rib-fruited mallee
 Eucalyptus corticosa L.A.S.Johnson – Creswick apple-box, Olinda box
 Eucalyptus corynodes A.R.Bean & Brooker
 Eucalyptus cosmophylla F.Muell. – cup gum, bog gum or scrub gum
 Eucalyptus costuligera L.A.S.Johnson & K.D.Hill
 Eucalyptus crebra F.Muell. – narrow-leaved ironbark, narrow-leaved red ironbark, muggago
 Eucalyptus crenulata Blakely & Beuzev. – Buxton gum, Victorian silver gum
 Eucalyptus creta L.A.S.Johnson & K.D.Hill – large-fruited gimlet
 Eucalyptus cretata P.J.Lang & Brooker – Darke Peak mallee
 Eucalyptus crispata Brooker & Hopper – Yandanooka mallee
 Eucalyptus croajingolensis L.A.S.Johnson & K.D.Hill – East Gippsland peppermint
 Eucalyptus crucis Maiden
 Eucalyptus crucis subsp. crucis – silver mallee
 Eucalyptus crucis subsp. lanceolata  Brooker & Hopper – narrow-leaved silver mallee
 Eucalyptus crucis subsp. praecipua  Brooker & Hopper – Paynes Find mallee
 Eucalyptus cullenii Cambage – Cullen's ironbark
 Eucalyptus cunninghamii Sweet – cliff mallee ash
 Eucalyptus cuprea Brooker & Hopper – mallee box
 Eucalyptus cupularis C.A.Gardner – Halls Creek white gum, wawulinggi
 Eucalyptus curtisii Blakely & C.T.White – Plunkett mallee
 Eucalyptus cuspidata Turcz.
 Eucalyptus cyanophylla Brooker – Murraylands mallee, blue-leaved mallee, ghost mallee
 Eucalyptus cyclostoma Brooker
 Eucalyptus cylindriflora Maiden & Blakely – white mallee
 Eucalyptus cylindrocarpa Blakely – woodline mallee
 Eucalyptus cypellocarpa L.A.S.Johnson – mountain grey gum, monkey gum, spotted mountain grey gum

D

 Eucalyptus dalrympleana Maiden – mountain gum, mountain white gum, broad-leaved ribbon gum
 Eucalyptus dalrympleana subsp. dalrympleana
 Eucalyptus dalrympleana subsp. heptantha L.A.S.Johnson
 Eucalyptus dawsonii R.T.Baker – slaty gum, slaty box,
 Eucalyptus dealbata A.Cunn. ex Schauer in W.G.Walpers – tumbledown red gum, hill redgum
 Eucalyptus deanei Maiden – mountain blue gum, round-leaved gum 
 Eucalyptus decipiens Endl. – redheart, redheart moit
 Eucalyptus decolor A.R.Bean & Brooker
 Eucalyptus decorticans (F.M.Bailey) Maiden – gum-top ironbark
 Eucalyptus decurva F.Muell. – slender mallee
 Eucalyptus deflexa Brooker – Lake King mallee
 Eucalyptus deglupta Blume (Indonesia, P.N.G.) – rainbow eucalyptus, Mindanao gum, rainbow gum
 Eucalyptus delegatensis F.Muell. ex R.T.Baker – alpine ash, gum-topped stringybark, white-top
 Eucalyptus delegatensis subsp. delegatensis
 Eucalyptus delegatensis subsp. tasmaniensis Boland
 Eucalyptus delicata L.A.S.Johnson & K.D.Hill
 Eucalyptus dendromorpha (Blakely) L.A.S.Johnson & Blaxell – Budawang ash, giant mallee ash
 Eucalyptus densa Brooker & Hopper
 Eucalyptus densa subsp. densa
 Eucalyptus densa subsp. improcera Brooker & Hopper
 Eucalyptus denticulata I.O.Cook & Ladiges – Errinundra shining gum, shining gum
 Eucalyptus depauperata L.A.S.Johnson & K.D.Hill
 Eucalyptus desmondensis Maiden & Blakely – Desmond mallee
 Eucalyptus deuaensis Boland & P.M.Gilmour – Mongamulla mallee
 Eucalyptus dielsii C.A.Gardner – cap-fruited mallee, cap-fruited mallet
 Eucalyptus diminuta Brooker & Hopper – spring mallee
 Eucalyptus diptera C.R.P.Andrews – two-winged gimlet
 Eucalyptus discreta Brooker
 Eucalyptus dissimulata Brooker – red-capped mallee
 Eucalyptus distans Brooker, Boland & Kleinig – Katherine box
 Eucalyptus distuberosa D.Nicolle
 Eucalyptus distuberosa subsp. aerata D.Nicolle
 Eucalyptus distuberosa subsp. distuberosa
 Eucalyptus diversicolor F.Muell. – karri
 Eucalyptus diversifolia Bonpl.
 Eucalyptus diversifolia subsp. diversifolia – soap mallee, coastal white mallee, coast gum
 Eucalyptus diversifolia subsp. hesperia I.J.Wright & Ladiges
 Eucalyptus dives Schauer in W.G.Walpers – broad-leaved peppermint, blue peppermint
 Eucalyptus dolichocera L.A.S.Johnson & K.D.Hill
 Eucalyptus dolichorhyncha (Brooker) Brooker & Hopper – fuchsia gum
 Eucalyptus dolorosa Brooker & Hopper – Mount Misery mallee, Dandaragan mallee
 Eucalyptus doratoxylon F.Muell. –  spearwood mallee, spearwood, geitch-gmunt
 Eucalyptus dorrigoensis (Blakely) L.A.S.Johnson & K.D.Hill – Dorrigo white gum
 Eucalyptus drummondii Benth. – Drummond's gum, Drummond's mallee
 Eucalyptus dumosa A.Cunn. ex Oxley – white mallee, dumosa mallee, Congoo mallee
 Eucalyptus dundasii Maiden – Dundas blackbutt
 Eucalyptus dunnii Maiden - Dunn's white gum, white gum
 Eucalyptus dura L.A.S.Johnson & K.D.Hill
 Eucalyptus dwyeri Maiden & Blakely – Dwyer's red gum, Dwyer's mallee gum

E

 Eucalyptus ebbanoensis Maiden – sandplain mallee
 Eucalyptus ebbanoensis subsp. ebbanoensis
 Eucalyptus ebbanoensis subsp. glauciramula L.A.S.Johnson & K.D.Hill
 Eucalyptus ebbanoensis subsp. photina Brooker & Hopper
 Eucalyptus ecostata (Maiden) D.Nicolle & M.E.French – coastal silver mallee
 Eucalyptus educta L.A.S.Johnson & K.D.Hill
 Eucalyptus effusa Brooker – rough-barked gimlet
 Eucalyptus effusa subsp. effusa
 Eucalyptus effusa subsp. exsul L.A.S.Johnson & K.D.Hill
 Eucalyptus elaeophloia Chappill, Crisp & Prober – Nunniong gum, olive mallee
 Eucalyptus elata Dehnh. – river peppermint, river white gum
 Eucalyptus elegans A.R.Bean
 Eucalyptus elliptica (Blakely & McKie) L.A.S.Johnson & K.D.Hill – Bendemeer white gum
 Eucalyptus erectifolia Brooker & Hopper – Stirling Range mallee
 Eucalyptus eremicola Boomsma – Vokes Hill mallee
 Eucalyptus eremicola subsp. eremicola
 Eucalyptus eremicola subsp. peeneri (Blakely) D.Nicolle
 Eucalyptus eremophila (Diels) Maiden – sand mallet, tall sand mallee
 Eucalyptus eremophila (Diels) Maiden subsp. eremophila (Blakely) D.Nicolle
 Eucalyptus eremophila subsp. pterocarpa (Blakely & H.Steedman) L.A.S.Johnson & Blaxell
 Eucalyptus erosa A.R.Bean
 Eucalyptus erythrocorys F.Muell. – illyarrie, red-capped gum, helmet nut gum
 Eucalyptus erythronema Turcz. – red-flowered mallee
 Eucalyptus erythronema Turcz. subsp. erythronema
 Eucalyptus erythronema subsp. inornata D.Nicolle & M.E.French
 Eucalyptus eudesmioides F.Muell. – mallalie, desert gum, mallabie
 Eucalyptus eugenioides Sieber ex Spreng. – thin-leaved stringybark, white stringybark
 Eucalyptus ewartiana Maiden – Ewart's mallee
 Eucalyptus exigua Brooker & Hopper
 Eucalyptus exilipes Brooker & A.R.Bean – fine-leaved ironbark
 Eucalyptus exilis Brooker – Boyagin mallee
 Eucalyptus expressa S.A.J.Bell & D.Nicolle – Wollemi stringybark
 Eucalyptus exserta F.Muell. – Queensland peppermint, bendo, yellow messmate
 Eucalyptus extensa L.A.S.Johnson & K.D.Hill
 Eucalyptus extrica D.Nicolle – eastern tallerack

F

 Eucalyptus falcata Turcz. – silver mallet, toolyumuck
 Eucalyptus falciformis (Newnham, Ladiges & Whiffin) Rule – Grampians peppermint, western peppermint
 Eucalyptus famelica Brooker & Hopper
 Eucalyptus farinosa K.D.Hill
 Eucalyptus fasciculosa F.Muell. – pink gum, hill gum, scrub gum
 Eucalyptus fastigata H.Deane & Maiden – brown barrel, cut-tail
 Eucalyptus fibrosa F.Muell. – red ironbark, broad-leaved red ironbark, broad-leaved red ironbark
 Eucalyptus fibrosa subsp. fibrosa
 Eucalyptus fibrosa subsp. nubila (Maiden & Blakely) L.A.S.Johnson – blue-leaved ironbark
 Eucalyptus filiformis Rule
 Eucalyptus fitzgeraldii Blakely – broad-leaved box, paper-barked box
 Eucalyptus flavida Brooker & Hopper – yellow-flowered mallee
 Eucalyptus flindersii Boomsma – South Australian grey mallee, mallee red gum, grey mallee
 Eucalyptus flocktoniae (Maiden) Maiden – merrit
 Eucalyptus flocktoniae subsp. flocktoniae
 Eucalyptus flocktoniae subsp. hebes D.Nicolle
 Eucalyptus foecunda Schauer in J.G.C.Lehmann – narrow-leaved red mallee, Fremantle mallee, coastal dune mallee
 Eucalyptus foliosa L.A.S.Johnson & K.D.Hill
 Eucalyptus formanii C.A.Gardner – Die Hardy mallee, Forman's mallee, feather gum
 Eucalyptus forresterae Molyneux & Rule – brumby sallee
 Eucalyptus forrestiana Diels – fuchsia gum, fuchsia mallee
 Eucalyptus fracta K.D.Hill
 Eucalyptus fraseri (Brooker) Brooker – Balladonia gum
 Eucalyptus fraseri subsp. fraseri
 Eucalyptus fraseri subsp. melanobasis L.A.S.Johnson & K.D.Hill
 Eucalyptus fraxinoides H.Deane & Maiden – white ash, white mountain ash
 Eucalyptus frenchiana D.Nicolle
 Eucalyptus froggattii Blakely – Kamarooka mallee
 Eucalyptus fruticosa Brooker
 Eucalyptus fulgens Rule – green scentbark
 Eucalyptus fusiformis Boland & Kleinig – grey ironbark, Nambucca ironbark

G

 Eucalyptus gamophylla F.Muell. – warilu, blue-leaved mallee, twin-leaved mallee, blue mallee
 Eucalyptus gardneri Maiden – blue mallet, woacal
 Eucalyptus gardneri subsp. gardneri
 Eucalyptus gardneri subsp. ravensthorpensis  Brooker & Hopper
 Eucalyptus georgei Brooker & Blaxell – Hyden blue gum
 Eucalyptus georgei subsp. fulgida Brooker & Hopper
 Eucalyptus georgei subsp. georgei
 Eucalyptus gigantangion L.A.S.Johnson & K.D.Hill – Kakadu woollybutt
 Eucalyptus gillenii Ewart & L.R.Kerr – mallee red gum, Mt Gillen mallee, Mt Lindsay mallee
 Eucalyptus gillii Maiden – curly mallee, Arkaroola mallee, silver mallee
 Eucalyptus gittinsii Brooker & Blaxell – northern sandplain mallee
 Eucalyptus gittinsii subsp. gittinsii
 Eucalyptus gittinsii subsp. illucida  D.Nicolle
 Eucalyptus glaucescens Maiden & Blakely in J.H.Maiden – Tingiringi gum, Tingaringy gum
 Eucalyptus glaucina (Blakely) L.A.S.Johnson – slaty red gum
 Eucalyptus globoidea Blakely – white stringybark
 Eucalyptus globulus Labill.
 Eucalyptus globulus subsp. bicostata (Maiden, Blakely & Simmonds) J.B.Kirkp. – southern blue gum, eurabbie, blue gum, Victorian blue gum
 Eucalyptus globulus Labill. subsp. globulus – Tasmanian blue gum, southern blue gum, blue gum
 Eucalyptus globulus subsp. maidenii  (F.Muell.) J.B.Kirkp. – Maiden's gum
 Eucalyptus globulus subsp. pseudoglobulus  (Naudin ex Maiden) J.B.Kirkp. – Victorian eurabbie
 Eucalyptus glomericassis L.A.S.Johnson & K.D.Hill – scarp white gum
 Eucalyptus glomerosa Brooker & Hopper – jinjulu
 Eucalyptus gomphocephala A.Cunn. ex DC. – tuart
 Eucalyptus gongylocarpa Blakely – baarla, marble gum, desert gum
 Eucalyptus goniantha Turcz. – Jerdacuttup mallee
 Eucalyptus goniantha subsp. goniantha
 Eucalyptus goniantha subsp. kynoura  D.Nicolle & M.E.French
 Eucalyptus goniocalyx F.Muell. ex Miq. – long-leaved box, olive-barked box, bundy
 Eucalyptus goniocalyx subsp. exposa D.Nicolle
 Eucalyptus goniocalyx subsp. fallax Rule
 Eucalyptus goniocalyx subsp. goniocalyx
 Eucalyptus goniocalyx subsp. laxa Rule
 Eucalyptus goniocalyx subsp. viridissima Rule
 Eucalyptus goniocarpa L.A.S.Johnson & K.D.Hill
 Eucalyptus gracilis F.Muell. –  yorrell, white mallee
 Eucalyptus grandis W.Hill – flooded gum, rose gum
 Eucalyptus granitica L.A.S.Johnson & K.D.Hill – granite ironbark
 Eucalyptus gregoryensis N.G.Walsh & Albr.
 Eucalyptus gregsoniana L.A.S.Johnson & Blaxell – Wolgan snow gum, mallee snow gum
 Eucalyptus griffithsii Maiden – Griffith's grey gum
 Eucalyptus grisea L.A.S.Johnson & K.D.Hill – grey gum
 Eucalyptus grossa F.Muell. ex Benth. – coarse-leaved mallee
 Eucalyptus guilfoylei Maiden – yellow tingle 
 Eucalyptus gunnii Hook.f. – cider gum
 Eucalyptus gunnii subsp. divaricata (McAulay & Brett) B.M.Potts
 Eucalyptus gunnii subsp. gunnii
 Eucalyptus gypsophila Nicolle – kopi mallee

H

 Eucalyptus haemastoma Sm. – scribbly gum
 Eucalyptus hallii Brooker – Goodwood gum
 Eucalyptus halophila D.J.Carr & S.G.M.Carr – salt lake mallee
 Eucalyptus hawkeri Rule
 Eucalyptus hebetifolia Brooker & Hopper
 Eucalyptus helidonica K.D.Hill
 Eucalyptus herbertiana Maiden – Kalumburu gum, yellow-barked mallee
 Eucalyptus histophylla Brooker & Hopper
 Eucalyptus horistes L.A.S.Johnson & K.D.Hill
 Eucalyptus houseana W.Fitzg. ex Maiden – Kimberley white gum, tropical white gum
 Eucalyptus howittiana F.Muell. – Howitt's box
 Eucalyptus hypolaena L.A.S.Johnson & K.D.Hill
 Eucalyptus hypostomatica L.A.S.Johnson & K.D.Hill – Pokolbin box

I

 Eucalyptus ignorabilis L.A.S.Johnson & K.D.Hill
 Eucalyptus imitans L.A.S.Johnson & K.D.Hill – Illawarra stringybark
 Eucalyptus imlayensis Crisp & Brooker – Mount Imlay mallee
 Eucalyptus impensa Brooker & Hopper – Eneabba mallee
 Eucalyptus incerata Brooker & Hopper – Mount Dau mallee
 Eucalyptus incrassata Labill. – lerp mallee, yellow mallee, ridge fruited mallee, rib fruited mallee
 Eucalyptus indurata Brooker & Hopper – ironbark or ironbark mallee
 Eucalyptus infera A.R.Bean – Durikai mallee
 Eucalyptus infracorticata L.A.S.Johnson & K.D.Hill
 Eucalyptus insularis Brooker – Twin Peak Island mallee, North Twin Peak Island mallee
 Eucalyptus insularis subsp. continentalis D.Nicolle & Brooker
 Eucalyptus insularis subsp. insularis
 Eucalyptus interstans L.A.S.Johnson & K.D.Hill
 Eucalyptus intertexta R.T.Baker western red box, gum coolibah, bastard coolibah

J

 Eucalyptus jacksonii Maiden – red tingle
 Eucalyptus jensenii Maiden – Wandi ironbark
 Eucalyptus jimberlanica L.A.S.Johnson & K.D.Hill – Norseman gimlet
 Eucalyptus johnsoniana Brooker & Blaxell – Johnson's mallee
 Eucalyptus johnstonii Maiden – Tasmanian yellow gum
 Eucalyptus jucunda C.A.Gardner – Yuna mallee
 Eucalyptus jutsonii Maiden – Jutson's mallee
 Eucalyptus jutsonii subsp. jutsonii 
 Eucalyptus jutsonii subsp. kobela D.Nicolle & M.E.French

K

 Eucalyptus kabiana L.A.S.Johnson & K.D.Hill – Mt Beerwah mallee
 Eucalyptus × kalangadooensis Maiden & Blakely
 Eucalyptus kartzoffiana L.A.S.Johnson & Blaxell – Araluen gum
 Eucalyptus kenneallyi K.D.Hill & L.A.S.Johnson – Kenneally's white gum
 Eucalyptus kessellii Maiden & Blakely – Jerdacuttup mallee
 Eucalyptus kessellii subsp. eugnosta L.A.S.Johnson & K.D.Hill
 Eucalyptus kessellii subsp. kessellii
 Eucalyptus kingsmillii (Maiden) Maiden & Blakely in J.H.Maiden
 Eucalyptus kingsmillii subsp. kingsmillii
 Eucalyptus kitsoniana Maiden – Gippsland mallee, bog gum
 Eucalyptus kochii Maiden & Blakely in J.H.Maiden – oil mallee
 Eucalyptus kochii subsp. amaryssia D.Nicolle
 Eucalyptus kochii subsp. borealis (C.A.Gardner) D.Nicolle
 Eucalyptus kochii subsp. kochii
 Eucalyptus kochii subsp. plenissima (C.A.Gardner) Brooker
 Eucalyptus kochii subsp. yellowdinensis D.Nicolle
 Eucalyptus kondininensis Maiden & Blakely – Kondinin blackbutt
 Eucalyptus koolpinensis Brooker & Dunlop – Koolpin box
 Eucalyptus kruseana F.Muell. – book-leaf mallee, Kruses's bookleaf mallee
 Eucalyptus kumarlensis Brooker
 Eucalyptus kybeanensis Maiden & Cambage – Kybean mallee ash

L

 Eucalyptus lacrimans L.A.S.Johnson & K.D.Hill – weeping snow gum
 Eucalyptus laeliae Podger & Chippend. – Darling Range ghost gum, butter gum
 Eucalyptus laevis L.A.S.Johnson & K.D.Hill
 Eucalyptus laevopinea F.Muell. ex R.T.Baker – silver top stringybark
 Eucalyptus × lamprocalyx Blakely
 Eucalyptus lane-poolei Maiden – salmon white gum
 Eucalyptus langleyi L.A.S.Johnson & Blaxell – green mallee ash, albatross mallee
 Eucalyptus lansdowneana F.Muell. & J.E.Br. in J.E.Brown – crimson mallee, red-flowered mallee box
 Eucalyptus largeana Blakely & Beuzev. in W.F.Blakely – Craven grey box
 Eucalyptus largiflorens F.Muell. – black box
 Eucalyptus × laseronii R.T.Baker
 Eucalyptus latens Brooker – narrow-leaved red mallee
 Eucalyptus lateritica Brooker & Hopper – laterite mallee
 Eucalyptus latisinensis K.D.Hill – white mahogany
 Eucalyptus lehmannii (Schauer) Benth. – bushy yate
 Eucalyptus lehmannii subsp. lehmannii
 Eucalyptus lehmannii subsp. parallela D.Nicolle & M.E.French
 Eucalyptus leprophloia Brooker & Hopper – scaly butt mallee
 Eucalyptus leptocalyx Blakely – Hopetoun mallee
 Eucalyptus leptocalyx subsp. leptocalyx
 Eucalyptus leptocalyx subsp. petilipes L.A.S.Johnson & K.D.Hill
 Eucalyptus leptophleba F.Muell. – Molloy red box, Molloy box
 Eucalyptus leptophylla F.Muell. ex Miq. – March mallee, slender-leaved red mallee, narrow-leaved red mallee
 Eucalyptus leptopoda Benth. – Tammin mallee,
 Eucalyptus leptopoda subsp. arctata L.A.S.Johnson & K.D.Hill
 Eucalyptus leptopoda subsp. elevata L.A.S.Johnson & K.D.Hill
 Eucalyptus leptopoda subsp. leptopoda
 Eucalyptus leptopoda subsp. subluta L.A.S.Johnson & K.D.Hill
 Eucalyptus lesouefii Maiden – goldfields blackbutt
 Eucalyptus leucophloia Brooker – snappy gum, migum
 Eucalyptus leucophloia subsp. euroa L.A.S.Johnson & K.D.Hill
 Eucalyptus leucophloia subsp. leucophloia
 Eucalyptus leucophylla Domin – Cloncurry box
 Eucalyptus leucoxylon F.Muell. – yellow gum, blue gum, white ironbark
 Eucalyptus leucoxylon subsp. bellarinensis Rule
 Eucalyptus leucoxylon subsp. connata Rule
 Eucalyptus leucoxylon subsp. leucoxylon
 Eucalyptus leucoxylon subsp. megalocarpa Boland
 Eucalyptus leucoxylon var. pluriflora Boland
 Eucalyptus leucoxylon subsp. pruinosa (Miq.) Boland
 Eucalyptus leucoxylon subsp. stephaniae Rule
 Eucalyptus ligulata Brooker – Lucky Bay mallee
 Eucalyptus ligulata subsp. ligulata
 Eucalyptus ligulata subsp. stirlingica D.Nicolle,
 Eucalyptus ligustrina A.Cunn. ex DC. – privet-leaved stringybark
 Eucalyptus limitaris L.A.S.Johnson & K.D.Hill
 Eucalyptus lirata W.Fitzg. ex Maiden – Kimberley yellowjacket
 Eucalyptus litoralis Rule – Anglesea box
 Eucalyptus litorea Brooker & Hopper – saline mallee
 Eucalyptus livida Brooker & Hopper – wandoo mallee
 Eucalyptus lockyeri Blaxell & K.D.Hill – Lockyer's box
 Eucalyptus lockyeri subsp. exuta Brooker & Kleinig
 Eucalyptus lockyeri subsp. lockyeri
 Eucalyptus longicornis (F.Muell.) Maiden – red morrel, morryl, poot, pu
 Eucalyptus longifolia Link – woollybutt
 Eucalyptus longirostrata (Blakely) L.A.S.Johnson & K.D.Hill – grey gum
 Eucalyptus longissima D.Nicolle
 Eucalyptus loxophleba Benth.
 Eucalyptus loxophleba subsp. gratiae Brooker – York gum, daarwet, goatta, twotta, yandee
 Eucalyptus loxophleba subsp. lissophloia L.A.S.Johnson & K.D.Hill
 Eucalyptus loxophleba subsp. loxophleba
 Eucalyptus loxophleba subsp. supralaevis L.A.S.Johnson & K.D.Hill
 Eucalyptus lucasii Blakely – Barlee box
 Eucalyptus lucens Brooker & Dunlop – shiny-leaved mallee
 Eucalyptus luculenta L.A.S.Johnson & K.D.Hill
 Eucalyptus luehmanniana F.Muell. – yellow top mallee ash
 Eucalyptus luteola Brooker & Hopper

M

 Eucalyptus macarthurii H.Deane & Maiden – Camden woollybutt, Paddy's river box
 Eucalyptus mackintii Kottek – blue-crowned stringybark
 Eucalyptus × macmahonii Rule
 Eucalyptus macrandra F.Muell. ex Benth. – long-flowered marlock, river yate, twet
 Eucalyptus macrocarpa Hook. – mottlecah
 Eucalyptus macrocarpa subsp. elachantha Brooker & Hopper
 Eucalyptus macrocarpa subsp. macrocarpa
 Eucalyptus macrorhyncha F.Muell. ex Benth. – red stringybark
 Eucalyptus macrorhyncha subsp. cannonii (R.T.Baker) L.A.S.Johnson & Blaxell
 Eucalyptus macrorhyncha subsp. macrorhyncha
 Eucalyptus magnificata L.A.S.Johnson & K.D.Hill – blue box, northern blue box
 Eucalyptus major (Maiden) Blakely – grey gum
 Eucalyptus malacoxylon Blakely – Moonbi apple box, apple box
 Eucalyptus mannensis Boomsma – Mann Range mallee
 Eucalyptus mannensis subsp. mannensis
 Eucalyptus mannensis subsp. vespertina L.A.S.Johnson & K.D.Hill
 Eucalyptus mannifera Mudie – brittle gum, red spotted gum
 Eucalyptus mannifera subsp. gullickii (R.T.Baker & H.G.Sm.) L.A.S.Johnson
 Eucalyptus mannifera subsp. mannifera
 Eucalyptus mannifera subsp. praecox (Maiden) L.A.S.Johnson
 Eucalyptus marginata Donn ex Sm. – jarrah, djarraly, Swan River mahogany
 Eucalyptus marginata subsp. marginata
 Eucalyptus marginata subsp. thalassica Brooker & Hopper
 Eucalyptus mckieana Blakely – McKie's stringybark
 Eucalyptus mcquoidii Brooker & Hopper – Quoin Head marlock
 Eucalyptus mediocris L.A.S.Johnson & K.D.Hill – inland white mahogany
 Eucalyptus megacarpa F.Muell. – bullich
 Eucalyptus megacornuta C.A.Gardner – warted yate, warty yate
 Eucalyptus megasepala A.R.Bean
 Eucalyptus melanoleuca S.T.Blake – yarraman ironbark, nanango ironbark
 Eucalyptus melanophitra Brooker & Hopper
 Eucalyptus melanophloia F.Muell. – silver-leaved ironbark
 Eucalyptus melanophloia subsp. melanophloia
 Eucalyptus melanophloia subsp. nana D.Nicolle & Kleinig
 Eucalyptus melanoxylon Maiden – black morrell
 Eucalyptus melliodora A.Cunn. ex Schauer in W.G.Walpers – yellow box, honey box, yellow ironbark
 Eucalyptus merrickiae Maiden & Blakely – goblet mallee
 Eucalyptus michaeliana Blakely – Hillgrove gum, brittle gum
 Eucalyptus micranthera F.Muell. ex Benth. – Alexander River mallee, milkshake mallee
 Eucalyptus microcarpa (Maiden) Maiden – grey box
 Eucalyptus microcorys F.Muell. – tallowwood
 Eucalyptus microneura Maiden & Blakely – Gilbert River box
 Eucalyptus microschema Brooker & Hopper
 Eucalyptus microtheca F.Muell. – coolibah
 Eucalyptus mimica Brooker & Hopper
 Eucalyptus mimica subsp. continens Brooker & Hopper
 Eucalyptus mimica subsp. mimica
 Eucalyptus miniata A.Cunn. ex Schauer in W.G.Walpers – Darwin woollybutt, woolewoorng
 Eucalyptus minniritchi D.Nicolle
 Eucalyptus misella L.A.S.Johnson & K.D.Hill
 Eucalyptus × missilis Brooker & Hopper
 Eucalyptus mitchelliana Cambage – Buffalo sallee, Mount Buffalo gum
 Eucalyptus moderata L.A.S.Johnson & K.D.Hill
 Eucalyptus moluccana Wall. ex Roxb. – grey box, gum-topped box, terriyergro
 Eucalyptus molyneuxii Rule
 Eucalyptus mooreana Maiden – Moore's gum, mountain white gum, King Leopold Range mallee
 Eucalyptus moorei Maiden & Cambage – narrow-leaved mallee
 Eucalyptus moorei subsp. moorei
 Eucalyptus moorei subsp.. serpentinicola (L.A.S.Johnson & Blaxell) Brooker & Kleinig
 Eucalyptus morrisbyi Brett – Morrisby's gum
 Eucalyptus morrisii R.T.Baker – grey mallee
 Eucalyptus muelleriana A.W.Howitt – yellow stringybark
 Eucalyptus multicaulis Blakely – whipstick mallee ash
 Eucalyptus myriadena Brooker – blackbutt
 Eucalyptus myriadena subsp. myriadena
 Eucalyptus myriadena subsp. parviflora  Brooker & Hopper

N

 Eucalyptus nandewarica L.A.S.Johnson & K.D.Hill – mallee red gum
 Eucalyptus nebulosa A.M.Gray – serpentine peppermint
 Eucalyptus neglecta Maiden – Omeo gum
 Eucalyptus × nepeanensis R.T.Baker & H.G.Sm.
 Eucalyptus neutra D.Nicolle – Newdegate mallee
 Eucalyptus newbeyi D.J.Carr & S.G.M.Carr – Beaufort Inlet mallee
 Eucalyptus nicholii Maiden & Blakely in J.H.Maiden – narrow-leaved black peppermint, willow peppermint
 Eucalyptus nigrifunda Brooker & Hopper – desert wandoo
 Eucalyptus nitens (H.Deane & Maiden) Maiden – shining gum, silvertop
 Eucalyptus nitida Hook.f. – Smithton peppermint
 Eucalyptus nobilis L.A.S.Johnson & K.D.Hill – ribbon gum, giant white gum
 Eucalyptus normantonensis Maiden & Cambage – Normanton box
 Eucalyptus nortonii (Blakely) L.A.S.Johnson – bundy, mealy bundy, long-leaved box
 Eucalyptus notabilis Maiden – Blue Mountains mahogany, mountain mahogany
 Eucalyptus notactites (L.A.S.Johnson & K.D.Hill) D.Nicolle & M.E.French – southern limestone mallee
 Eucalyptus nova-anglica H.Deane & Maiden New England peppermint, black peppermint
 Eucalyptus × nowraensis Maiden
 Eucalyptus nudicaulis A.R.Bean
 Eucalyptus nutans F.Muell. – red-flowered moort

O

 Eucalyptus obconica Brooker & Kleinig
 Eucalyptus obesa Brooker & Hopper – Ninety Mile Tank mallee
 Eucalyptus obliqua L'Hér. – messmate stringybark, messmate
 Eucalyptus obtusiflora A.Cunn. ex DC.) – Dongara mallee
 Eucalyptus obtusiflora subsp. cowcowensis L.A.S.Johnson & K.D.Hill
 Eucalyptus obtusiflora subsp. dongarraensis (Maiden & Blakely) L.A.S.Johnson & K.D.Hill
 Eucalyptus obtusiflora subsp. obtusiflora
 Eucalyptus occidentalis Endl. – flat-topped yate, swamp yate, mo, yundill
 Eucalyptus ochrophloia F.Muell. – yapunyah
 Eucalyptus odontocarpa F.Muell. – Sturt Creek mallee, warilyu
 Eucalyptus odorata Behr – peppermint box
 Eucalyptus oldfieldii F.Muell. – Oldfield's mallee
 Eucalyptus oldfieldii F.Muell. subsp. oldfieldii 
 Eucalyptus oleosa F.Muell. ex Miq. – red mallee, glossy-leaved red mallee, acorn mallee, oil mallee, giant mallee
 Eucalyptus oleosa subsp. ampliata L.A.S.Johnson & K.D.Hill
 Eucalyptus oleosa subsp. corvina L.A.S.Johnson & K.D.Hill
 Eucalyptus oleosa subsp. cylindroidea L.A.S.Johnson & K.D.Hill
 Eucalyptus oleosa subsp. oleosa
 Eucalyptus olida L.A.S.Johnson & K.D.Hill
 Eucalyptus oligantha Schauer in W.G.Walpers – broad-leaved box
 Eucalyptus oligantha subsp. modica L.A.S.Johnson & K.D.Hill
 Eucalyptus oligantha subsp. oligantha
 Eucalyptus olivina Brooker & Hopper
 Eucalyptus olsenii L.A.S.Johnson & Blaxell – woila gum
 Eucalyptus ophitica L.A.S.Johnson & K.D.Hill – serpentine ironbark
 Eucalyptus opimiflora D.Nicolle & M.E.French – northern silver mallee
 Eucalyptus optima L.A.S.Johnson & K.D.Hill
 Eucalyptus oraria L.A.S.Johnson – ooragmandee
 Eucalyptus orbifolia F.Muell. – round-leaved mallee
 Eucalyptus ordiana Dunlop & Done
 Eucalyptus oreades F.Muell. ex R.T.Baker – Blue Mountains ash, white ash, smooth-barked mountain ash
 Eucalyptus orgadophila Maiden & Blakely in J.H.Maiden – mountain coolibah
 Eucalyptus ornans Molyneux & Rule – Avon peppermint
 Eucalyptus ornata Crisp – silver mallet
 Eucalyptus orophila L.D.Pryor
 Eucalyptus orthostemon D.Nicolle & Brooker
 Eucalyptus ovata Labill. – swamp gum or black gum
 Eucalyptus ovata var. grandiflora Maiden
 Eucalyptus ovata Labill. var. ovata
 Eucalyptus ovularis Maiden & Blakely – small-fruited mallee
 Eucalyptus oxymitra Blakely – sharp-capped mallee

P

 Eucalyptus pachycalyx Maiden & Blakely in J.H.Maiden – shiny-barked gum
 Eucalyptus pachycalyx subsp. banyabba K.D.Hill
 Eucalyptus pachycalyx subsp. pachycalyx
 Eucalyptus pachycalyx subsp. waajensis  L.A.S.Johnson & K.D.Hill
 Eucalyptus pachyloma Benth. – Kalgan Plains mallee
 Eucalyptus pachyphylla F.Muell. – thick-leaved mallee, red-budded mallee
 Eucalyptus paedoglauca L.A.S.Johnson & Blaxell – Mount Stuart ironbark
 Eucalyptus paliformis L.A.S.Johnson & Blaxell – Wadbilliga ash
 Eucalyptus paludicola Nicolle – Mount Compass swamp gum, marsh gum, Fleurieu swamp gum
 Eucalyptus panda S.T.Blake – tumbledown ironbark, Yetman ironbark
 Eucalyptus paniculata Sm. – grey ironbark
 Eucalyptus pantoleuca L.A.S.Johnson & K.D.Hill – round-leaved gum, Panton River white gum
 Eucalyptus paralimnetica L.A.S.Johnson & K.D.Hill
 Eucalyptus parramattensis E.C.Hall – Parramatta red gum, drooping red gum
 Eucalyptus parramattensis subsp. decadens L.A.S.Johnson & Blaxell
 Eucalyptus parramattensis subsp. parramattensis
 Eucalyptus parramattensis var. sphaerocalyx Blakely
 Eucalyptus parvula L.A.S.Johnson & K.D.Hill – small-leaved gum
 Eucalyptus patellaris F.Muell. – weeping box
 Eucalyptus patens Benth. – yarri, blackbutt,
 Eucalyptus pauciflora Sieber ex Spreng. – snow gum, cabbage gum, white sally
 Eucalyptus pauciflora subsp. acerina Rule – snow gum
 Eucalyptus pauciflora var. × cylindrocarpa Blakely
 Eucalyptus pauciflora subsp. debeuzevillei (Maiden) L.A.S.Johnson & Blaxell – Jounama snow gum
 Eucalyptus pauciflora var. × densiflora Blakely & McKie
 Eucalyptus pauciflora subsp. hedraia Rule
 Eucalyptus pauciflora subsp. niphophila (Maiden & Blakely) L.A.S.Johnson & Blaxell
 Eucalyptus pauciflora subsp. parvifructa Rule
 Eucalyptus pauciflora Sieber ex Spreng. subsp. pauciflora
 Eucalyptus pauciflora var. × rusticata Blakely
 Eucalyptus pellita F.Muell. – large-fruited red mahogany
 Eucalyptus pendens Brooker – Badgingarra weeping mallee
 Eucalyptus peninsularis D.Nicolle – Cummins mallee
 Eucalyptus perangusta Brooker – fine-leaved mallee
 Eucalyptus percostata Brooker & P.J.Lang – rib-capped mallee, Devils peak mallee
 Eucalyptus perriniana F.Muell. ex Rodway – spinning gum
 Eucalyptus persistens L.A.S.Johnson & K.D.Hill
 Eucalyptus petiolaris (Boland) Rule – Eyre Peninsula blue gum, water gum, blue gum
 Eucalyptus petraea D.J.Carr & S.G.M.Carr – granite rock box
 Eucalyptus petrensis Brooker & Hopper – limestone mallee, straggly mallee, koodjat
 Eucalyptus phaenophylla Brooker & Hopper – common southern mallee
 Eucalyptus phaenophylla subsp. interjacens Brooker & Hopper
 Eucalyptus phaenophylla Brooker & Hopper subsp. phaenophylla
 Eucalyptus phenax Brooker & Slee – green dumosa mallee, white mallee
 Eucalyptus phenax subsp. compressa D.Nicolle
 Eucalyptus phenax Brooker & Slee subsp. phenax
 Eucalyptus phoenicea F.Muell. – scarlet gum, gnaingar, ngainggar
 Eucalyptus phoenix Molyneux & Forrester – brumby mallee-gum
 Eucalyptus × phylacis L.A.S.Johnson & K.D.Hill – Meelup mallee
 Eucalyptus pilbarensis Brooker & Edgecombe
 Eucalyptus pileata Blakely – capped mallee
 Eucalyptus pilularis Sm. – blackbutt
 Eucalyptus pimpiniana Maiden – pimpin mallee
 Eucalyptus piperita Sm. – Sydney peppermint, urn-fruited peppermint
 Eucalyptus placita L.A.S.Johnson & K.D.Hill – grey ironbark
 Eucalyptus planchoniana F.Muell. – needlebark stringybark, bastard tallowwood
 Eucalyptus planipes L.A.S.Johnson & K.D.Hill
 Eucalyptus platycorys Maiden & Blakely in J.H.Maiden – Boorabbin mallee
 Eucalyptus platydisca D.Nicolle & Brooker – Jimberlana mallee
 Eucalyptus platyphylla F.Muell. – poplar gum or white gum
 Eucalyptus platypus Hook.f. – moort, maalok
 Eucalyptus platypus subsp. congregata Brooker & Hopper
 Eucalyptus platypus Hook.f. subsp. platypus
 Eucalyptus pleurocarpa Schauer in J.G.C.Lehmann – tallerack, talyerock, tallerack
 Eucalyptus pleurocorys L.A.S.Johnson & K.D.Hill
 Eucalyptus pluricaulis Brooker & Hopper – purple-leaved mallee
 Eucalyptus pluricaulis Brooker & Hopper subsp. pluricaulis
 Eucalyptus pluricaulis subsp. porphyrea Brooker & Hopper
 Eucalyptus polita Brooker & Hopper
 Eucalyptus polyanthemos Schauer – red box
 Eucalyptus polyanthemos subsp. longior  Brooker & Slee
 Eucalyptus polyanthemos subsp. marginalis  Rule
 Eucalyptus polyanthemos Schauer subsp. polyanthemos
 Eucalyptus polyanthemos subsp. vestita  L.A.S.Johnson & K.D.Hill
 Eucalyptus polybractea F.Muell. ex R.T.Baker – blue-leaved mallee, blue mallee
 Eucalyptus populnea F.Muell. – poplar box, bimble box, bimbil box
 Eucalyptus porosa F.Muell. ex Miq. – mallee box, Quorn mallee, water mallee
 Eucalyptus praetermissa Brooker & Hopper
 Eucalyptus prava L.A.S.Johnson & K.D.Hill – orange gum
 Eucalyptus preissiana Schauer – bell-fruited mallee
 Eucalyptus preissiana subsp. lobata  Brooker & Slee
 Eucalyptus preissiana Schauer subsp. preissiana
 Eucalyptus prolixa D.Nicolle – square-fruited mallet
 Eucalyptus prominens Brooker
 Eucalyptus propinqua H.Deane & Maiden – grey gum, small-fruited grey gum
 Eucalyptus protensa L.A.S.Johnson & K.D.Hill
 Eucalyptus provecta A.R.Bean
 Eucalyptus proxima D.Nicolle & Brooker – nodding mallee, red-flowered mallee
 Eucalyptus pruiniramis L.A.S.Johnson & K.D.Hill – Jingymia gum, midlands gum
 Eucalyptus pruinosa Schauer in W.G.Walpers – silver box, silver leaf box, apple box, smoke tree
 Eucalyptus pruinosa subsp. pruinosa
 Eucalyptus pruinosa subsp. tenuata  L.A.S.Johnson & K.D.Hill
 Eucalyptus psammitica L.A.S.Johnson & K.D.Hill – bastard white mahogany
 Eucalyptus pterocarpa C.A.Gardner ex P.J.Lang
 Eucalyptus pulchella Desf. – white peppermint, narrow-leaved peppermint
 Eucalyptus pulverulenta Link – silver-leaved mountain gum
 Eucalyptus pumila Cambage – Pokolbin mallee
 Eucalyptus punctata A.Cunn. ex DC. – grey gum
 Eucalyptus purpurata D.Nicolle – Bandalup silver mallet
 Eucalyptus pyrenea Rule – Pyrenees gum
 Eucalyptus pyriformis Turcz. – pear-fruited mallee, Dowerin rose
 Eucalyptus pyrocarpa L.A.S.Johnson & Blaxell – large-fruited blackbutt

Q

 Eucalyptus quadrangulata H.Deane & Maiden – white-topped box, coast white box
 Eucalyptus quadrans Brooker & Hopper 
 Eucalyptus quadricostata Brooker – square-fruited ironbark
 Eucalyptus quaerenda (L.A.S.Johnson & K.D.Hill) Byrne
 Eucalyptus quinniorum J.T.Hunter & J.J.Bruhl – monkey gum

R

 Eucalyptus racemosa Cav. – snappy gum, narrow-leaved scribbly gum
 Eucalyptus radiata Sieber ex DC. – narrow-leaved peppermint, Forth River peppermint,
 Eucalyptus radiata Sieber ex DC. subsp. radiata
 Eucalyptus radiata subsp. robertsonii (Blakely) L.A.S.Johnson & Blaxell
 Eucalyptus radiata subsp. sejuncta L.A.S.Johnson & K.D.Hill
 Eucalyptus rameliana F.Muell. – Ramel's mallee
 Eucalyptus raveretiana F.Muell. – black ironbox
 Eucalyptus ravida L.A.S.Johnson & K.D.Hill
 Eucalyptus recta L.A.S.Johnson & K.D.Hill – silver mallet
 Eucalyptus recurva Crisp – Mongarlowe mallee
 Eucalyptus redimiculifera L.A.S.Johnson & K.D.Hill
 Eucalyptus redunca Schauer in J.G.C.Lehmann – black marlock
 Eucalyptus regnans F.Muell. – mountain ash, swamp gum, stringy gum
 Eucalyptus relicta Hopper & Ward.-Johnson
 Eucalyptus remota Blakely – Kangaroo Island ash, Kangaroo Island mallee ash, Mount Taylor mallee
 Eucalyptus repullulans Nicolle – chrysoprase mallee
 Eucalyptus resinifera J.White – red mahogany, red messmate
 Eucalyptus resinifera subsp. hemilampra (F.Muell.) L.A.S.Johnson & K.D.Hill
 Eucalyptus resinifera Sm. subsp. resinifera 
 Eucalyptus retinens L.A.S.Johnson & K.D.Hill – Hillgrove box
 Eucalyptus retusa D.Nicolle, M.E.French & McQuoid – Point Hood yate
 Eucalyptus rhodantha Blakely & H.Steedman – rose mallee
 Eucalyptus rhodantha  var. petiolaris Blakely
 Eucalyptus rhodantha Blakely & H.Steedman var. rhodantha 
 Eucalyptus rhombica A.R.Bean & Brooker
 Eucalyptus rhomboidea Hopper & D.Nicolle – diamond gum
 Eucalyptus rigens Brooker & Hopper – saltlake mallee, blue salt mallee
 Eucalyptus rigidula Cambage & Blakely in J.H.Maiden – stiff-leaved mallee
 Eucalyptus risdonii Hook.f. – Risdon peppermint
 Eucalyptus robusta Sm. – swamp mahogany, swamp messmate
 Eucalyptus rodwayi R.T.Baker & H.G.Sm. – swamp peppermint
 Eucalyptus rosacea L.A.S.Johnson & K.D.Hill
 Eucalyptus rossii R.T.Baker & H.G.Sm. – inland scribbly gum, white gum
 Eucalyptus rowleyi D.Nicolle & M.E.French
 Eucalyptus roycei S.G.M.Carr, D.J.Carr & A.S.George – Shark Bay mallee
 Eucalyptus rubida H.Deane & Maiden – candlebark, ribbon gum, white gum
 Eucalyptus rubida subsp. barbigerorum L.A.S.Johnson & K.D.Hill
 Eucalyptus rubida H.Deane & Maiden subsp. rubida
 Eucalyptus rubiginosa Brooker
 Eucalyptus rudderi Maiden – Rudder's box
 Eucalyptus rudis Endl. – flooded gum, moitch, colaille, gooloorto, koolert
 Eucalyptus rudis subsp. cratyantha Brooker & Hopper
 Eucalyptus rudis Endl. subsp. rudis
 Eucalyptus rugosa R.Br. ex Blakely – Kingscote mallee
 Eucalyptus rugulata D.Nicolle
 Eucalyptus rummeryi Maiden – steel box, Rummery's box, brown box
 Eucalyptus rupestris Brooker & Done – Prince Regent gum

S

 Eucalyptus sabulosa Rule – Wimmera scentbark
 Eucalyptus salicola Brooker – salt gum, salt lake salmon gum, salt salmon gum
 Eucalyptus saligna Sm. – Sydney blue gum or blue gum
 Eucalyptus salmonophloia F.Muell. salmon gum, wurak, weerluk
 Eucalyptus salubris F.Muell. – gimlet, fluted gum tree, gimlet gum, silver-topped gimlet
 Eucalyptus sargentii Maiden – Salt River gum
 Eucalyptus sargentii subsp. onesia D.Nicolle
 Eucalyptus sargentii subsp. sargentii
 Eucalyptus saxatilis J.B.Kirkp. & Brooker – Suggan Buggan mallee, Mount Wheeler mallee
 Eucalyptus scias L.A.S.Johnson & K.D.Hill – large-fruited red mahogany
 Eucalyptus scias subsp. apoda L.A.S.Johnson & K.D.Hill
 Eucalyptus scias subsp. scias
 Eucalyptus scoparia Maiden – Wallangarra white gum, willow gum
 Eucalyptus scopulorum K.D.Hill
 Eucalyptus scyphocalyx (Benth.) Maiden & Blakely in J.H.Maiden – goblet mallee
 Eucalyptus scyphocalyx subsp. scyphocalyx
 Eucalyptus scyphocalyx subsp. triadica L.A.S.Johnson & K.D.Hill
 Eucalyptus seeana Maiden – narrow-leaved red gum
 Eucalyptus semiglobosa (Brooker) L.A.S.Johnson & K.D.Hill
 Eucalyptus semota Macph. & Grayling – marymia mallee
 Eucalyptus sepulcralis F.Muell. – weeping gum, weeping mallee
 Eucalyptus serraensis Ladiges & Whiffin – Grampians stringybark
 Eucalyptus sessilis (Maiden) Blakely – Finke River mallee, red bud mallee, river mallee
 Eucalyptus sheathiana Maiden – ribbon-barked gum
 Eucalyptus shirleyi Maiden – Shirley's silver leafed ironbark, silver-leaved ironbark, Shirley's silver leaved ironbark
 Eucalyptus sicilifolia L.A.S.Johnson & K.D.Hill
 Eucalyptus siderophloia Benth. – northern grey ironbark
 Eucalyptus sideroxylon A.Cunn. ex Woolls – mugga ironbark, red ironbark
 Eucalyptus sideroxylon subsp. improcera A.R.Bean
 Eucalyptus sideroxylon subsp. sideroxylon
 Eucalyptus sieberi L.A.S.Johnson – silvertop ash, black ash
 Eucalyptus silvestris Rule
 Eucalyptus similis Maiden – inland yellowjacket, Queensland yellowjacket
 Eucalyptus singularis L.A.S.Johnson & Blaxell
 Eucalyptus sinuosa D.Nicolle, M.E.French & McQuoid – octopus mallee
 Eucalyptus smithii F.Muell. ex R.T.Baker – gully gum, gully peppermint, blackbutt peppermint, ironbark peppermint
 Eucalyptus socialis F.Muell. ex Miq. – red mallee, grey mallee
 Eucalyptus socialis subsp. eucentrica (L.A.S.Johnson & K.D.Hill) D.Nicolle – inland red mallee
 Eucalyptus socialis F.Muell. ex Miq. subsp. socialis – summer red mallee
 Eucalyptus socialis subsp. victoriensis D.Nicolle – red mallee
 Eucalyptus socialis subsp. viridans D.Nicolle – green-leaved red mallee
 Eucalyptus sparsa Boomsma – northern ranges box
 Eucalyptus sparsifolia Blakely – narrow-leaved stringybark
 Eucalyptus spathulata Hook. – swamp mallet, narrow leaved gimlet, swamp gimlet
 Eucalyptus spathulata subsp. salina D.Nicolle & Brooker
 Eucalyptus spathulata subsp. spathulata
 Eucalyptus sphaerocarpa L.A.S.Johnson & Blaxell – Blackdown stringybark
 Eucalyptus splendens Rule – apple jack
 Eucalyptus sporadica Brooker & Hopper – Burngup mallee
 Eucalyptus spreta L.A.S.Johnson & K.D.Hill
 Eucalyptus squamosa H.Deane & Maiden – scaly bark
 Eucalyptus staeri (Maiden) Maiden ex Kessell & C.A.Gardner – Albany blackbutt
 Eucalyptus staigeriana F.Muell. ex F.M.Bailey – lemon-scented ironbark
 Eucalyptus steedmanii C.A.Gardner – Steedman's gum, Steedman's mallet
 Eucalyptus stellulata Sieber ex DC. – black sallee, black sally
 Eucalyptus stenostoma L.A.S.Johnson & Blaxell – Jillaga ash
 Eucalyptus × stoataptera E.M.Benn.
 Eucalyptus stoatei C.A.Gardner – scarlet pear gum, Stoat's mallee
 Eucalyptus stowardii Maiden – fluted-horn mallee
 Eucalyptus striaticalyx W.Fitzg. – Cue York gum, kopi gum
 Eucalyptus striaticalyx subsp. delicata D.Nicolle & P.J.Lang
 Eucalyptus striaticalyx W.Fitzg. subsp. striaticalyx
 Eucalyptus stricklandii Maiden – Strickland's gum
 Eucalyptus stricta Sieber ex Spreng. – Blue Mountains mallee ash
 Eucalyptus strzeleckii Rule – Strzelecki gum, wax-tip
 Eucalyptus sturgissiana L.A.S.Johnson & Blaxell steel box, Ettrema mallee
 Eucalyptus subangusta (Blakely) Brooker & Hopper
 Eucalyptus subangusta subsp. cerina Brooker & Hopper
 Eucalyptus subangusta subsp. pusilla Brooker & Hopper
 Eucalyptus subangusta subsp. subangusta
 Eucalyptus subangusta subsp. virescens Brooker & Hopper
 Eucalyptus subcrenulata Maiden & Blakely in J.H.Maiden Tasmanian alpine yellow gum
 Eucalyptus suberea Brooker & Hopper – Mount Lesueur mallee, cork mallee
 Eucalyptus subtilis Brooker & Hopper – narrow-leaved mallee
 Eucalyptus suffulgens L.A.S.Johnson & K.D.Hill
 Eucalyptus suggrandis L.A.S.Johnson & K.D.Hill
 Eucalyptus suggrandis subsp. promiscua D.Nicolle & Brooker
 Eucalyptus suggrandis subsp. suggrandis
 Eucalyptus surgens Brooker & Hopper
 Eucalyptus sweedmaniana Hopper & McQuoid
 Eucalyptus synandra Crisp – Jingymia mallee

T

 Eucalyptus talyuberlup D.J.Carr & S.G.M.Carr – Stirling Range yate
 Eucalyptus tardecidens (L.A.S.Johnson & K.D.Hill) A.R.Bean
 Eucalyptus taurina A.R.Bean & Brooker – Helidon ironbark
 Eucalyptus tectifica F.Muell. – Darwin box, grey box
 Eucalyptus tenella L.A.S.Johnson & K.D.Hill – narrow-leaved stringybark
 Eucalyptus tenera L.A.S.Johnson & K.D.Hill – glazed mallee, sand mallee
 Eucalyptus tenuipes (Maiden & Blakely) Blakely & C.T.White – narrow-leaved white mahogany
 Eucalyptus tenuiramis Miq. – silver peppermint
 Eucalyptus tenuis Brooker & Hopper
 Eucalyptus tephroclada L.A.S.Johnson & K.D.Hill
 Eucalyptus tephrodes L.A.S.Johnson & K.D.Hill
 Eucalyptus terebra L.A.S.Johnson & K.D.Hill – Balladonia gimlet
 Eucalyptus tereticornis Sm. – forest red gum, blue gum, red irongum
 Eucalyptus tereticornis subsp. basaltica A.R.Bean
 Eucalyptus tereticornis subsp. mediana Brooker & Slee
 Eucalyptus tereticornis subsp. rotunda A.R.Bean
 Eucalyptus tereticornis Sm. subsp. tereticornis
 Eucalyptus terrica A.R.Bean
 Eucalyptus tetrapleura L.A.S.Johnson – square-fruited ironbark
 Eucalyptus tetraptera Turcz. – square-fruited mallee, four-winged mallee
 Eucalyptus tetrodonta F.Muell. – Darwin stringybark, messmate
 Eucalyptus thamnoides Brooker & Hopper
 Eucalyptus thamnoides subsp. megista Brooker & Hopper
 Eucalyptus thamnoides subsp. thamnoides
 Eucalyptus tholiformis A.R.Bean & Brooker
 Eucalyptus thozetiana F.Muell. ex R.T.Baker
 Eucalyptus tindaliae Blakely in J.H.Maiden – Tindal's stringybark
 Eucalyptus tintinnans (Blakely & Jacobs) L.A.S.Johnson & K.D.Hill – ringing gum, Hills salmon gum
 Eucalyptus todtiana F.Muell. – coastal blackbutt, pricklybark, dwutta
 Eucalyptus × tokwa D.J.Carr & S.G.M.Carr
 Eucalyptus torquata Luehm. – coral gum, Coolgardie gum
 Eucalyptus tortilis L.A.S.Johnson & K.D.Hill
 Eucalyptus transcontinentalis Maiden – redwood, boongul
 Eucalyptus tricarpa (L.A.S.Johnson) L.A.S.Johnson & K.D.Hill – red ironbark, mugga ironbark
 Eucalyptus tricarpa subsp. decora Rule
 Eucalyptus tricarpa (L.A.S.Johnson) L.A.S.Johnson & K.D.Hill subsp. tricarpa
 Eucalyptus triflora (Maiden) Blakely – Pigeon House ash, three-flowered ash
 Eucalyptus trivalva Blakely – Victoria Spring mallee, desert mallee
 Eucalyptus tumida Brooker & Hopper

U

 Eucalyptus ultima L.A.S.Johnson & K.D.Hill
 Eucalyptus umbra F.Muell. ex R.T.Baker – broad-leaved white mahogany
 Eucalyptus umbrawarrensis Maiden – Umbrawarra gum
 Eucalyptus uncinata Turcz. – hook-leaved mallee
 Eucalyptus urna D.Nicolle – merrit
 Eucalyptus urnigera Hook.f. – urn tree
 Eucalyptus × urnularis D.J.Carr & S.G.M.Carr
 Eucalyptus urophylla S.T.Blake (Indonesia, Timor) – Timor white gum, Timor mountain gum, popo, ampupu
 Eucalyptus utilis Brooker & Hopper – coastal moort, coastal mort

V

 Eucalyptus valens L.A.S.Johnson & K.D.Hill
 Eucalyptus varia Brooker & Hopper
 Eucalyptus varia subsp. salsuginosa Brooker & Hopper
 Eucalyptus varia  Brooker & Hopper subsp. varia
 Eucalyptus vegrandis L.A.S.Johnson & K.D.Hill – Ongerup mallee
 Eucalyptus vegrandis subsp. recondita D.Nicolle & Brooker
 Eucalyptus vegrandis L.A.S.Johnson & K.D.Hill subsp. vegrandis
 Eucalyptus vernicosa Hook.f. – varnished gum
 Eucalyptus verrucata Ladiges & Whiffin – Mount Abrupt stringybark
 Eucalyptus vesiculosa Brooker & Hopper – Corackerup marlock
 Eucalyptus vicina L.A.S.Johnson & K.D.Hill – Manara Hills red gum
 Eucalyptus victoriana Ladiges & Whiffin
 Eucalyptus victrix L.A.S.Johnson & K.D.Hill – smooth-barked coolibah, western coolibah, little ghost gum
 Eucalyptus viminalis Labill. – manna gum, white gum, ribbon gum
 Eucalyptus viminalis subsp. cygnetensis Boomsma
 Eucalyptus viminalis subsp. hentyensis Brooker & Slee
 Eucalyptus viminalis subsp. pryoriana (L.A.S.Johnson) Brooker & Slee
 Eucalyptus viminalis subsp. siliceana Rule
 Eucalyptus viminalis Labill. subsp. viminalis
 Eucalyptus virens Brooker & A.R.Bean – shiny-leaved ironbark
 Eucalyptus virginea Hopper & Ward.-Johnson
 Eucalyptus viridis R.T.Baker – green mallee
 Eucalyptus vittata D.Nicolle
 Eucalyptus vokesensis D.Nicolle & L.A.S.Johnson & K.D.Hill – Vokes Hill mallee
 Eucalyptus volcanica L.A.S.Johnson & K.D.Hill

W

 Eucalyptus walshii Rule
 Eucalyptus wandoo Blakely – wandoo, dooto, warrnt, wornt
 Eucalyptus wandoo subsp. pulverea Brooker & Hopper
 Eucalyptus wandoo Blakely subsp. wandoo Eucalyptus websteriana Maiden – Webster's mallee, heart-leaf mallee, dainty mallee
 Eucalyptus websteriana subsp. norsemanica L.A.S.Johnson & K.D.Hill
 Eucalyptus websteriana Maiden subsp. websteriana Eucalyptus wetarensis L.D.Pryor
 Eucalyptus whitei Maiden & Blakely – White's ironbark
 Eucalyptus wilcoxii Boland & Kleinig – Deua gum
 Eucalyptus williamsiana L.A.S.Johnson & K.D.Hill – large-leaved stringybark
 Eucalyptus willisii Ladiges, Humphries & Brooker – shining peppermint, promontory peppermint
 Eucalyptus wimmerensis Rule – Wimmera mallee box, broad-leaved green mallee
 Eucalyptus woodwardii Maiden – lemon-flowered gum, Woodward's blackbutt
 Eucalyptus woollsiana F.Muell. ex R.T.Baker
 Eucalyptus wubinensis L.A.S.Johnson & K.D.Hill
 Eucalyptus wyolensis Boomsma – Wyola mallee

X

 Eucalyptus xanthonema Turcz. – yellow-flowered mallee
 Eucalyptus xanthonema subsp. apposita Brooker & Hopper
 Eucalyptus xanthonema Turcz. subsp. xanthonema Eucalyptus xerothermica L.A.S.Johnson & K.D.Hill

Y

 Eucalyptus yalatensis Boomsma – Yalata mallee
 Eucalyptus yarraensis Maiden & Cambage in J.H.Maiden – Yarra gum
 Eucalyptus yarriambiack Rule
 Eucalyptus yilgarnensis (Maiden) Brooker – yorrell, yorrel
 Eucalyptus youmanii Blakely & McKie – Youman's stringybark
 Eucalyptus youmanii var. sphaerocarpa Blakely & McKie
 Eucalyptus youngiana F.Muell. – large-fruited mallee, Ooldea mallee, yarldarlba
 Eucalyptus yumbarrana Boomsma – Yumbarra mallee

Z

 Eucalyptus zopherophloia Brooker & Hopper – blackbutt mallee

 See also 
List of Corymbia species

 References 

 Brooker, I., Kleinig, D.(1996) Eucalyptus, An illustrated guide to identification, Reed Books, Port Melbourne
 Cronin, L.(2000) Key Guide to Australian Trees, Envirobook
 Holliday, I.(2002) A field guide to Australian trees (3rd edition)'', Reed New Holland

External links

Eucalyptus
Eucalyptus